Arto Järvelä (born in 1964 in Hattula, Finland) is a Finnish fiddler and composer. Because of the many groups and projects he is involved in, he has been called "the busiest man in Finnish folk music". He is primarily a violinist, but among other instruments of his are nyckelharpa, mandolin and kantele. Arto Järvelä is the fourth generation of the well known Järvelä fiddler family, whose musical roots belong in the rural area close to the small town Kaustinen.

As a ten-year-old, he started to play the drums and bass guitar in a family band, together with his father. He got serious on the fiddle at about 13 years of age. He played the harmonium (pump organ) in a band of youngsters called Järvelän pikkupelimannit (the small fiddlers from the Järvelä village) until he got good enough on the fiddle to join the group as a fiddler. This group eventually became the most well known Finnish fiddler folk music group, abbreviating its name into JPP. Besides having learned to play the traditional route, Järvelä is also trained in the Sibelius Academy's department for folk music, where he nowadays also teaches.

Among the groups where he is or has been a member are

JPP
The trio Alakotila-Järvelä-Kennemark, along with Timo Alakotila from JPP and the Swedish fiddler Hans Kennemark
Koinurit, a group playing polskas as fast as possible sometimes called Finland's answer to the Pogues
Pinnin Pojat, Arto and Kimmo Pohjonen. The original setting, later expanded, was Kimmo on mouth harp and Arto on fiddle/nyckelharpa/mandolin
Helsinki Mandoliners, a mandolin trio
Lumisudet, the Finnish-Texan fiddler Erik Hokkanen's band
Aldargaz, accordionist Maria Kalaniemis group
Niekku, one of Maria Kalaniemi's earlier bands form while students at the Sibelius Academy
Salamakannel, kantele with rock influences
Ampron Prunni, harmonium och nyckelharpa
Tallari

Solo discography
Only solo records mentioned here. Titles of JPP records can be found under the groups entry.

Polska Differente, 1994
Arto Järvelä plays fiddle, 1999
Far in!, 2004
Arto Järvelä plays fiddle Vol.2: Cross-tuned 2012
Arto Järvelä plays fiddle Vol.3: On the coast 2013

External links

1964 births
Living people
People from Hattula
Nyckelharpa players
Mandolinists
Nordic folk musicians
Finnish violinists
Finnish composers
Finnish male composers
Finnish fiddlers
Male violinists
Finnish mandolinists
21st-century violinists
21st-century male musicians